Santa Isabel (Spanish for "St. Elizabeth of Portugal") is a city in Mexicali Municipality, Baja California. The city had a population of 33,604 as of 2018. Located just south of the US-Mexico border, Santa Isabel is a part of the Calexico–Mexicali metropolitan area.

Economy
The city is the location of Silicon Border.

Demographics

See also
 Mexicali

References

Mexicali Municipality
Populated places in Baja California